Bobby Nutley (10 September 1916 – 14 July 1996) was a Scottish footballer, who played for Blantyre Victoria, Hibernian, Portsmouth and Queen of the South.

In the late 1930s, Nutley was the regular left winger for Hibs. He represented the Scottish League once, in 1939. His football career was then interrupted by the Second World War. After making just one league appearance for Hibs after the end of the war, Nutley played in the Football League for Portsmouth. He then returned to Scotland and had a short spell with Dumfries club Queen of the South.

References

Sources

Bobby Nutley, Fitbastats.com

1916 births
1996 deaths
Footballers from Paisley, Renfrewshire
Association football wingers
Scottish footballers
Blantyre Victoria F.C. players
Hibernian F.C. players
Portsmouth F.C. players
Queen of the South F.C. players
Scottish Football League players
Scottish Football League representative players
English Football League players
Scottish Junior Football Association players